The Voice of Peace is a charitable fundraising organization in Ukraine that is dedicated to helping volunteer battalions and refugees.

Aim
The charitable marathon-auction The Voice of Peace was organized to support Ukrainian defenders and raise funds to help volunteer battalions participating in the military operation in the East of Ukraine and families of refugees.

History
The Voice of Peace started on 21 September 2014 in Kramatorsk, Donetsk region. The organisers include the charitable foundation "Resistance Movement", the association of NGOs "Social protection", the international NGO "Follow Your Dream", Art Hundred "The Voice of Peace".

The group also holds an auction where the belongings of famous people are put up for sale. The first item auctioned was a T-shirt from the band The Gadiukiny Brothers member Braty Hadyukiny, which was bought  for $US300. The most expensive item auctioned was an edition of Kobzar from the family library of Julia and Eugenia Tymoshenko, sold for $65,000.

Activities

 21 September 2014: a charitable concert for the soldiers of 34th ("Motherland") and 42nd ("Resistance Movement") volunteer battalions and self-defense battalion in Kramatorsk
 23 October 2014: the Art Hundred and organizers of "The Voice of Peace" visited Sloviansk with the charitable mission, where the 95th Airmobile Brigade (Ukraine) of the Armed Forces of Ukraine is situated, to provide humanitarian aid, and organise a concert for the soldiers
 11 November 2014: a charitable concert was held in Lviv Military Hospital for 600 soldiers wounded in the area of ATO. The organizers of the marathon brought humanitarian aid, medical equipment and medicines.
 12 December 2014: the charitable marathon visited Starobilsk (Luhansk region). The Art Hundred and the organizers visited Starobilsk cemetery and commemorated 37 fallen fighters from the 80th airmobile brigade and soldiers of "Aydar" battalion. They gave a charity concert and brought humanitarian aid, blankets, boilers, insoles, building materials for shower cabins, medicines, foods, sweets, children's drawings and letters of support.
 29–30 December 2014: the organizers of "The Voice of Peace" delivered Christmas gifts to soldiers of ATO in Starobilsk, Polovinkyne, Shchastia and the Luhansk TPP (thermal power station).
 28 January 2015: volunteers of "The Voice of Peace" bought and delivered an ambulance car to the area of ATO.

References

2014 establishments in Ukraine
Charities based in Ukraine
Organizations established in 2014